Wang Yaopeng (born 18 January 1995) is a Chinese footballer who currently plays as a defender for Chinese Super League side Dalian Professional.

Club career
Wang Yaopeng started his professional football career in 2013 when he was loaned to China League Two side Liaoning Youth for the 2013 China League Two. He was promoted to Chinese Super League side Dalian Aerbin (now known as Dalian Professional) by manager Ma Lin in 2014. On 16 April 2015, he made his debut for the club in a 2–0 win against amateur club Hangzhou Ange in the 2015 Chinese FA Cup. He made his league debut on 16 May 2015 in a 3–1 away win over Shenzhen, coming on as a substitute for Zou You in the 72nd minute. 

He would mainly play for the reserve team while Dalian Yifang was in the second tier, however he would be part of the squad that won the division and promotion to the top tier at the end of the 2017 China League One campaign. On 3 March 2018, he made his Super League debut in an 8–0 crushing defeat against Shanghai SIPG, coming on for Sun Guowen in the 66th minute. Despite this result, Wang would keep his place within the team and helped ensure the club remained within the division at the end of the season.

Career statistics
.

Honours

Club
Dalian Yifang/ Dalian Professional
China League One: 2017.

References

External links
 

1995 births
Living people
Chinese footballers
Footballers from Dalian
Dalian Professional F.C. players
Chinese Super League players
China League One players
China League Two players
Association football defenders